Lars Hartig (born 24 December 1990) is a German rower. A World and European medallist, he participated in the 2012 Summer Olympics in London where he competed in the Men's lightweight double sculls event together with his teammate Linus Lichtschlag. They qualified for the A finals, where they reached a sixth place.

In 2010, Hartig and Lichtschlag won the men's lightweight double sculls at the European Championship.  The year before, Hartig and Christian Hochbruck won the same event at the U23 World Championships.

In 2014, he won silver in the men's lightweight single sculls at the World Championships, and silver at the European Championships in the men's lightweight double sculls with Konstantin Steinhübel.

References

1990 births
Living people
Rowers at the 2012 Summer Olympics
German male rowers
Olympic rowers of Germany
World Rowing Championships medalists for Germany
People from Husum
European Rowing Championships medalists
Sportspeople from Schleswig-Holstein